Although it is the second oldest continental tournament after Copa América, the AFC Asian Cup didn't practice using mascots until near the end of 20th century when UEFA European Championship had begun to practice since 1980. This late catch up was due to different in regions, and different in cultures affected on the decision of several host nations in the continent, and lack of interests. The AFC Asian Cup only began to use mascot for the first time in 2000. The first mascot was Nour, a Sparrow for the 2000 AFC Asian Cup in Lebanon. Since then, with the exception of 2007 edition, every Asian Cups all feature mascot for the tournament. It depends on the number the host wants to choose, such as the 2011 edition in Qatar had five mascots, but others except upcoming UAE only had one. The mascot for the Asian Cup is also very diverse, based on rich cultural heritages reflection of the host country.

List of mascots
Total 5 mascots were featured ever since the Asian Cup accepted using mascots since 2000:

See also
 List of FIFA World Cup official mascots
 List of UEFA European Championship official mascots
 List of Copa América official mascots
 List of Africa Cup of Nations official mascots

References

External links

mascot
Association football mascots
Lists of mascots